The Brown Palace Hotel, in Mobridge, South Dakota, United States, is a hotel that was started in 1915 and completed three years later.  It was listed on the National Register of Historic Places in 1983.

It was an enterprise of Albert H. Brown, a businessman. He also donated the A. H. Brown Public Library, which is also listed on the National Register.

References

Buildings and structures in Walworth County, South Dakota
Hotel buildings completed in 1918
Hotel buildings on the National Register of Historic Places in South Dakota
National Register of Historic Places in Walworth County, South Dakota